Willard John Smith (May 14, 1910 – April 1, 2000) served as the 13th commandant of the United States Coast Guard from 1966 to 1970.

He was born in Suttons Bay, Michigan, and was the son of Oscar Smith, a retired commissioned warrant officer in the U.S. Coast Guard and his wife, Emma Bequist. Upon graduation from high school in Charlevoix, Michigan, he entered the University of Michigan, but later transferred to the United States Coast Guard Academy in New London, Connecticut.

Upon graduation from the academy in 1933, he was assigned to a Galveston, Texas-based Coast Guard cutter and later served as an aide to Commandant Russell R. Waesche from 1936 to 1939. During World War II, he was assigned to the Coast Guard's aviation branch and was responsible for the construction and commissioning of Coast Guard Air Station San Francisco, California, where he was assigned to duty until 1946. From 1946 to 1948, he served as commander of Coast Guard Air Station Traverse City, Michigan before his assignment as assistant chief of the Coast Guard's Aviation Division from 1948 to 1950. From 1950 to 1951, he attended the Armed Forces Staff College in Norfolk, Virginia. From 1962 to 1965, he served as superintendent of the United States Coast Guard Academy.

From 1965, until his appointment as commandant, he served as commander of the Cleveland, Ohio-based 9th Coast Guard District. As commandant in 1967, he oversaw the transfer of the Coast Guard from the United States Department of the Treasury to the United States Department of Transportation.

Upon completion of his service as Coast Guard Commandant in June 1970, he moved to Traverse City, Michigan. The following October, he was appointed as Assistant Secretary for Safety and Consumer Affairs at the United States Department of Transportation, serving under then-Secretary of Transportation John A. Volpe until July 1971, when he returned to Traverse City.  In 1973 he became admiral of the Great Lakes Maritime Academy in Traverse City, Michigan and held the position until 1974.

He subsequently moved to Atlantic Beach, Florida, where his wife, the former Harriet A. Lary died on February 2, 2000, two months before he himself died, aged 89. His remains were interred alongside his late wife at Arlington National Cemetery. At the time of his death, he was the oldest-living former Coast Guard Commandant.

Dates of rank

Notes

Citations

References

External links
 

1910 births
2000 deaths
Commandants of the United States Coast Guard
United States Coast Guard admirals
United States Coast Guard Aviation
United States Coast Guard Academy alumni
People from Leelanau County, Michigan
People from Charlevoix, Michigan
People from Atlantic Beach, Florida
Military personnel from Michigan
Military personnel from Florida
Burials at Arlington National Cemetery
University of Michigan alumni